Jose Luis Cabrera (born 1984) is a Guatemalan American contemporary visual artist, specializing in painting, sculpture, assemblage art, and video installations.

Cabrera's work involves the production of ethereal, enigmatic, romantic, Neo—magical realism and supernatural imagery. His work makes references to personal memories and found imagery.  His conceptual and technical approach to making contemporary works of art is deeply influenced by the supernatural occurrences in the everyday life; Neo-expressionism, Baroque painting, Ancient Egyptian art, Mayan art, and graffiti. He currently lives and works in both Miami. Jose Cabrera's work has been out of sight from the gallery and mainstreams channels for the last couple of years, as told be an interview done 2017vevo. He is prime interest in the quote " the Lab Era" has been to develop his Technic and practice. He currently offers his work to collectors directly from his website, one of the few artists to really take on this idea of freeing themselves from the standard Old gallery model in contemporary art.

Biography
Jose Luis Cabrera graduated in 2009 from the School of the Art Institute of Chicago. His work is included in permanent collections, including: the El Rey Jesús collection;Dwyane Wade collection; Citadel LLC collection; A Woman's Worth Foundation collection, and the Giorgio Armani collection.

Exhibitions
Jose Luis Cabrera exhibited the "Let's play series Collection", his largest solo exhibition to date, at the University Club of Chicago during September—December 2009. In 2010, Cabrera exhibited in several group and solo exhibitions in venues such as the Museum of Contemporary Art, Chicago, and internationally in Switzerland, Dubai, and Central America. In 2014 Jose Cabrera was exhibition in the Miami Biennale and auction were his works sold out well before the exhibition started.

In December 2007 Cabrera exhibited at Miami Art Basel, in Miami Beach, Florida, where he was awarded the Youth Artist Award. In 2007, he presented several exhibitions, including: Inner and outer space, a solo exhibition at the Coconut Grove Rotary Club in Miami.

See also
Contemporary art
Art Institute of Chicago
Gagosian
white cube

References

External links
 Official website
Noctuary-paintings — jose-luis-cabrera
Onthemake.org: jose-luis-cabrera-noctuary
Robert-bills-gallery
Jose Luis Cabrera - reception - Robert Bills Contemporary

American contemporary painters
American video artists
Artists from Florida
1984 births
Living people
20th-century American painters
21st-century American painters
American male painters
20th-century American male artists